Count Basic are an Austrian band who play a variety of R&B, trip hop, acid jazz and smooth jazz. The band's principal members were guitarist Peter Legat and the two vocalists Kelli Sae and Valerie Etienne but the band decided to go on only with Kelli Sae after the first album.

Discography

1995 Life Think It Over
1996 The Remix Hit Collection, Vol. 1
1996 Movin' in the Right Direction
1997 Live
2000 Trust Your Instincts
2002 Bigger & Brighter
2004 First Decade (1994-2004)
2007 Love & Light
2014 Sweet Spot

External links 
 Count Basic at Discogs
 Count Basic on Facebook

Smooth jazz ensembles
Acid jazz ensembles